Elizabeth Dale (27 March 1868 – ?) was a British botanist, paleobotanist, plant pathologist, and author.

Written works

References

1868 births
British women scientists
British botanists
Paleobotanists
British phytopathologists
Women phytopathologists
Year of death missing